Jiayuguan (嘉峪关) may refer to two locations in Gansu, China:

Jiayuguan (pass), pass of the Great Wall of China
Jiayuguan City, prefecture-level city